Hungary in its modern (post-1946) borders roughly corresponds to the Great Hungarian Plain (the Pannonian Basin). During the Iron Age, it was located at the crossroads between the cultural spheres of the Celtic tribes (such as the Scordisci, Boii and Veneti), Dalmatian tribes (such as the Dalmatae, Histri and Liburni) and the Germanic tribes (such as the Lugii and Marcomanni).

The name "Pannonian" comes from Pannonia, a province of the Roman Empire. Only the western part of the territory (the so-called Transdanubia) of modern Hungary formed part of Pannonia. The Roman control collapsed with the Hunnic invasions of 370–410, and Pannonia was part of the Ostrogothic Kingdom during the late 5th to mid 6th century, succeeded by the Avar Khaganate (6th to 9th centuries). The Magyar invasion took place during the 9th century.

The Magyars were Christianized at the end of the 10th century, and the Christian Kingdom of Hungary was established in 1000 under King Saint Stephen, ruled by the Árpád dynasty for the following three centuries. In the high medieval period, the kingdom expanded to the Adriatic coast and entered a personal union with Croatia during the reign of King Coloman in 1102. In 1241 during the reign of King Béla IV, Hungary was invaded by the Mongols under Batu Khan. The outnumbered Hungarians were decisively defeated at the Battle of Mohi by the Mongol army. In this invasion more than 500,000 Hungarian people were massacred and the whole kingdom reduced to ashes. The paternal lineage of the ruling Árpád dynasty came to end in 1301, and all of the subsequent kings of Hungary (with the exception of King Matthias Corvinus) were cognatic descendants of the Árpád dynasty. Hungary bore the brunt of the Ottoman wars in Europe during the 15th century. The peak of this struggle took place during the reign of Matthias Corvinus (r. 1458–1490). The Ottoman–Hungarian wars concluded in significant loss of territory and the partition of the kingdom after the Battle of Mohács of 1526.

Defense against Ottoman expansion shifted to Habsburg Austria, and the remainder of the Hungarian kingdom came under the rule of the Habsburg emperors. The lost territory was recovered with the conclusion of the Great Turkish War, thus the whole of Hungary became part of the Habsburg monarchy. Following the nationalist uprisings of 1848, the Austro-Hungarian Compromise of 1867 elevated Hungary's status by the creation of a joint monarchy. The territory grouped under the Habsburg Archiregnum Hungaricum was much larger than modern Hungary, following the Croatian–Hungarian Settlement of 1868 which settled the political status of the Kingdom of Croatia-Slavonia within the Lands of the Crown of Saint Stephen.

After the first World War, the Central Powers enforced the dissolution of the Habsburg monarchy. The treaties of Saint-Germain-en-Laye and Trianon detached around 72% of the territory of the Kingdom of Hungary, which was ceded to Czechoslovakia, the Kingdom of Romania, the Kingdom of Serbs, Croats and Slovenes, the First Austrian Republic, the Second Polish Republic and the Kingdom of Italy. Afterwards a short-lived People's Republic was declared. It was followed by a restored Kingdom of Hungary but was governed by a regent, Miklós Horthy. He officially represented the Hungarian monarchy of Charles IV, Apostolic King of Hungary, who was held in captivity during his last months at Tihany Abbey. Between 1938 and 1941, Hungary recovered part of her lost territories. During World War II Hungary came under German occupation in 1944, then under Soviet occupation until the end of the war. After World War II, the Second Hungarian Republic was established within Hungary's current-day borders as a socialist People's Republic, lasting from 1949 to the end of communism in Hungary in 1989. The Third Republic of Hungary was established under an amended version of the constitution of 1949, with a new constitution adopted in 2011. Hungary joined the European Union in 2004.

Early history

Pre-Roman age 

Middle Paleolithic presence of Homo heidelbergensis is evidenced by the discovery of the "Samu" fossil, dated to c. 300,000 years ago, with traces of habitation as old as 500,000 years ago. Presence of anatomically modern humans dates to c. 33,000 years ago (Aurignacian). Neolithization began with the Starčevo–Kőrös–Criș culture, c. 6000 BC. The Bronze Age began with the Vučedol culture (Makó culture), c. 3000 BC.

The Iron Age commenced around 800 BC, associated with "Thraco-Cimmerian" artefact types, representing the overlap of the pre-Scythian (Novocherkassk culture) and pre-Celtic (Hallstatt culture) cultural spheres. Hallstatt occupation of western Transdanubia is evident from about 750 BC. Early Greek ethnography locates the Scythian Agathyrsi and the Sigynnae in the region. The Pannonians, who were a type of Illyrians were also important residents.

Their dominance was broken by the Celtic settlement which began in the 4th century BC. By 370 BC the Celts occupied most of Transdanubia from the Pannonians, and around 300 BC they waged successful war against the Scythians. These peoples merged with each other through time. Archaeological evidence shows the advanced state of agriculture and pottery of the La Tène culture. Southern Transdanubia was controlled by the most powerful Celtic tribe, the Scordisci, who were resisted from the east by the Dacians.

The Dacians were dominated by the Celts and couldn't engage in politics until the 1st century BC, when the tribes were united by Burebista. Dacia subdued the Scordisci, Taurisci and Boii, however Burebista died shortly after and the centralized power collapsed.

Roman rule 

Prior to the invasions, the Romans maintained friendly relations and traded with the locals. The Roman Empire conquered the territory of modern-day Hungary in multiple waves. Between 35 and 8 BC, Augustus and his son Tiberius fought the Pannonians for the Drava-Sava region, crushing the Scordisci and some rebellious tribes further south—adding the acquired territories to Illyricum province for now. Following these successes the tribes in Transdanubia surrendered without opposition. Temporarily the Danube was also exceeded, but the recent arrival of the Iazyges and another uprising forced the Romans to consolidate their gains at the river border. Soon the province of Pannonia formed. Its first city became Emona, modern-day Ljubljana. Other important Latin settlements were Sirmium (Sremska Mitrovica), Savaria (Szombathely), Siscia (Sisak) and Poetovio (Ptuj). Road building started in a high pace: the Danubian road network made sailing in the river possible. During the Marcomannic Wars, Pannonia suffered devastation by a powerful alliance of barbaric peoples led by the Marcomanni, but after they were defeated, an age of prosperity started.

The Dacians to the east reunited under Decebalus, harassing the limes, the Roman frontier defense system. Trajan, who achieved the greatest territorial extent of the empire, totally defeated them in two wars and established the province of Dacia. Decebalus himself committed suicide. Latin, Greek and Asiatic colonists settled on the decimated indigenous people, establishing Ulpia Traiana, Napoca (Cluj-Napoca), Apulum (Alba Iulia), Porolissum (Mirșid) and Potaissa (Turda) among others. They heavily exploited the gold and silver mines of Transylvania. Finally, the southward movement of the Germanic Goths forced Emperor Aurelian to evacuate the province.

After a long period of secure Roman rule, from the 320's Pannonia was again in frequent war with the East Germanic and Sarmatian peoples to the north and east. Both the Vandals and the Goths marched through the province, causing huge destruction. After the division of the Roman Empire, Pannonia remained under the rule of the Western Roman Empire, although the district of Sirmium was actually more in the sphere of influence of the East. As the Latin population of the province fled from the continuous barbarian incursions, Hunnic groups began to appear on the verge of the Danube. Under King Rugila, the nomads settled the Great Hungarian Plain, pushing the border guarding peoples westward, but stopping them from reaching Italy in exchange for the transfer of Eastern Pannonia. In 433, Aëtius played the western part too into Attila's hand for suppressing the Burgundians.

Migration period 
In 453, King Attila died suddenly, resulting in the quick disintegration of his empire. The Huns withdrew to Eastern Europe following the defeat of Attila's son, Ellac, by a coalition of Germanic tribes from the Carpathian Basin. Consequently, the Ostrogoths and Gepids established their kingdoms in the western and eastern part of the Carpathian Basin. Their wars left the region in ruins when King Theodoric abandoned it for the Italian Peninsula, leaving a power vacuum in Pannonia. From the beginning of the 6th century, the Lombards gradually took possessions in the region, eventually reaching Sirmium, the contemporary capital of the Gepid Kingdom. After a series of wars involving the Byzantines, the latter finally fell to the invasion of the nomadic Pannonian Avars led by Khagan Bayan I. Due to their fear of the powerful Avars, the Lombards also departed to Italy in 568, thereafter the whole basin came under the rule of the Avar Khaganate.

The rule of the Germanic peoples was followed by almost two and a half centuries long nomadic rule. The Avar khagan controlled a vast amount of territory spanning from Vienna to the Don river, often waging war against the Byzantines, Germans and Italians. The Pannonian Avars and the other freshly arrived steppe peoples in their confederation, such as the Kutrigurs, intermingled with Slavic and Germanic elements, and completely absorbed the Sarmatians. Rich archaeological evidence indicates that in the southern border, which was in state of constant fighting with the Byzantines, Avar settlements were built very densely. The Avars also brought down subjected peoples and played an important role in the Slavic migrations to the Balkans. The 7th century brought a serious crisis to the Avar society. After a failed attempt of capturing Constantinople in 626, the submitted peoples rose up against their domination, with many like the Onogurs in the east and the Slavs of Samo in the west breaking away. The creation of the First Bulgarian Empire distanced the Byzantine Empire from the Avar Khaganate, so the expanding Frankish Empire became its new main rival.

After Charlemagne of Francia sat on the Bavarian throne in 788, the two countries started to share a wide border. Border conflicts were usual. In 791, they engaged in full war. After the Franks won a quick and important victory in the Vienna Woods, the Avars adopted the strategy of "scorched-earth", avoiding new engagements and destroying enemy food supplies. They caused huge casualties to the invading army and deprived them from any profit from the war. Four years later, a civil war broke out in the khaganate, with many high ranking persons, including the khagan himself falling. Transdanubia was vasallized by Charlemagne, and after an uprising against his superiority, brutally annexed as the Avar March (later the March of Pannonia) with much its population slaughtered. Beyond the Danube, the Bulgars, led by their energetic khan Krum routed the army of the new khagan in 804, who fled to court of the now Emperor of the Romans. The Avar Khaganate virtually ceased to exist.

Although diminished, the Avars continued the inhabit the Carpathian Basin. The most significant stock, however became the rapidly increasing Slavs who entered the territory mainly from the south. Under the expansionist policy of the Kingdom of the East Franks, (since the division of the Frankish Empire in 843) the rudimentary Slavic polities couldn't develop, except one, the Principality of Moravia, which was able to expand into modern-day Western Slovakia. The Bulgarians lacked the power to establish effective control over Transylvania.

Medieval Hungary

Conquest and early principality (895–1000)

The Hungarians migrated into the Carpathian Basin in the late ninth century, the first certain mention of them living in the region dates to 862. The conquest proper started from 894, when armed conflicts opened with the Bulgarians and Moravians after the requests for help from Arnulf, Frankish king and Leo VI, Byzantine emperor. During the occupation, the Hungarians found sparse population and met no well-established states or effective control of any empire in the plain. They were able to take over the basin quickly, defeating the First Bulgarian Tsardom, disintegrating the Principality of Moravia, and firmly establishing their state there by 900. The invasion wasn't aimed at plundering the acquired lands as attacks were led by gyula Árpád and kende Kurszán, the two highest-ranking leaders, who left no mass graves behind them showing that the transition back to an Avar-like system was peaceful for the locals. Archaeological findings indicate that they settled in the lands near the Sava and Nyitra by this time. The military power of the nation allowed the Hungarians to conduct successful fierce campaigns as far as the territories of modern Spain. A defeat at the Battle of Lechfeld in 955 signaled an end to raids on western territories, although they continued into lands controlled by the Byzantine Empire until 970, and links between the tribes weakened. Prince Géza of the Árpád dynasty, who ruled only part of the united territory, was the nominal overlord of all seven Magyar tribes. He aimed to integrate Hungary into Christian Western Europe.

The name Hungary derives from the designation  for the Magyars, first recorded in Byzantine sources of the 9th century (in the 10th century as Latin ). The initial H- is a non-phonemic addition made in Middle Latin, first used in the late 12th century. During the Middle Ages, Byzantine sources also referred to the Magyar state as Tourkia (Turkey).Géza established a dynasty by naming his son Vajk (later King Stephen I of Hungary) as his successor. This decision was contrary to the dominant tradition of the time to have the eldest surviving member of the ruling family succeed the incumbent. By ancestral right, Prince Koppány, the oldest member of the dynasty, should have claimed the throne, but Géza chose his first-born son to be his successor instead. After Géza's death in 997, Koppány took up arms, and many subjects in Transdanubia joined him. The rebels claimed to represent the old political order, ancient human rights, tribal independence and pagan belief. Stephen won a decisive victory over Koppány and had him executed.

Patrimonial Kingdom (1000–1301)

Hungary was recognized as an Apostolic Kingdom under Saint Stephen I. According to later Hungarian tradition, Stephen was crowned with the Holy Crown of Hungary on the first day of the second millennium in the capital city of Esztergom. Pope Sylvester II conferred on him the right to have the cross carried before him, with full administrative authority over bishoprics and churches. By 1006, Stephen had solidified his power by eliminating all rivals who either wanted to follow the old pagan traditions or wanted an alliance with the Eastern Christian Byzantine Empire. Stephen established a network of ten episcopal and two archiepiscopal sees, and ordered the buildup of monasteries, churches and cathedrals. In the earliest times, the Hungarian language, part of the Uralic languages family, was written in a runic-like script. The country switched to the Latin alphabet under Stephen, and Latin was the official language of the country between 1000 and 1844. Stephen followed the Frankish administrative model. The whole of this land was divided into counties (megyék), each under a royal official called an ispán (equivalent to the title count), later főispán. This official represented the king's authority, administered his subjects, and collected the taxes that formed the national revenue. Each ispán maintained an armed force of freemen at his fortified headquarters ("castrum" or "vár").

After the Great Schism between Western Roman Catholic and Eastern Orthodox Christianity was formalized in 1054, Hungary viewed itself as the easternmost bastion of Western civilisation, a judgment affirmed in the 15th century by Pope Pius II, who expressed himself to Holy Roman Emperor Frederick III in these terms: "Hungary is the shield of Christianity and the protector of Western civilization".

The Árpád dynasty produced monarchs throughout the 12th and 13th centuries. King Béla III (r. 1172–1196) was the wealthiest and most powerful member of the dynasty, with an annual equivalent of 23,000 kg of pure silver at his disposal, in accordance with his income register. This exceeded the resources of the French king (estimated at some 17,000 kilograms) and was double the amount available to the English Crown. In 1195, Béla expanded the Hungarian kingdom southward and westward to Bosnia and Dalmatia and extended suzerainty over Serbia, a process that helped to break up the Byzantine Empire and diminish its influence in the Balkan region.

The early 13th century in Hungary was distinguished by the reign of King Andrew II, who acceded to the throne in 1205 and died in 1235. In 1211, he granted the Burzenland (in Transylvania) to the Teutonic Knights but in 1225 expelled them from Transylvania, hence the Teutonic Order had to transfer to the Baltic Sea. Andrew set up the largest royal army in the history of the Crusades (20,000 knights and 12,000 castle-garrisons) when he led the Fifth Crusade to the Holy Land in 1217. In 1224, he issued the Diploma Andreanum, which unified and ensured the special privileges of the Transylvanian Saxons.

Andrew II was forced to accept the Golden Bull of 1222, which was the Hungarian equivalent of England's Magna Carta to which every Hungarian king thereafter had to swear. The Golden Bull had a twofold purpose that limited royal power. On the one hand, it reaffirmed the rights of the smaller nobles of the old and new classes of royal servants (servientes regis) against both the crown and the magnates. On the other hand, it defended the rights of the whole nation against the crown by restricting the powers of the latter in certain fields and making refusal to obey its unlawful/unconstitutional commands (the ius resistendi) legal. The lesser nobles also began to present Andrew with grievances, a practice that evolved into the institution of the Parliament, or Diet. Hungary became the first country in which a parliament had supremacy over the kingship. The most important legal ideology was the Doctrine of the Holy Crown. The most important principle of the doctrine was the belief that sovereignty belonged to the noble nation (as represented by the Holy Crown). The members of the Holy Crown were the citizens of the Crown's lands, and no citizen could attain absolute power over the others. The nation would share only some political power with the ruler.

Mongol invasions

In 1241–1242, the kingdom suffered a major blow in the wake of the Mongol invasion of Europe. After Hungary was invaded by the Mongols in 1241, the Hungarian army was defeated disastrously at the Battle of Mohi. King Béla IV fled the battlefield and then the country after the Mongols pursued him to its borders. Before the Mongols retreated, a large part of the population (20-50%) died. In the plains, between 50 and 80% of the settlements were destroyed. Only castles, strongly fortified cities and abbeys could withstand the assault, as the Mongols had no time for long sieges—their goal was to move west as soon as possible. The siege engines and the Chinese and Persian engineers that operated them for the Mongols had been left in the conquered lands of Kyivan Rus'. The devastation caused by the Mongol invasions later led to the invitation of settlers from other parts of Europe, especially from Germany.

During the Mongols' campaign against Kievan Rus, some 40,000 Cumans, members of a nomadic tribe of pagan Kipchaks, were driven west of the Carpathian Mountains. There, the Cumans appealed to King Béla IV for protection. The Iranian Jassic people came to Hungary together with the Cumans after they were defeated by the Mongols. Cumans constituted perhaps up to 7–8% of the population of Hungary in the second half of the 13th century. Over the centuries they were fully assimilated into the Hungarian population, and their language disappeared, but they preserved their identity and their regional autonomy until 1876.

As a consequence of the Mongol invasions, King Béla ordered the construction of hundreds of stone castles and fortifications to help defend against a possible second Mongol invasion. The Mongols did indeed return to Hungary in 1286, but the newly built stone-castle systems and new military tactics involving a higher proportion of heavily armed knights stopped them. The invading Mongol force was defeated near Pest by the royal army of King Ladislaus IV. Later invasions were also repelled handily. The castles built by Béla IV proved to be very useful at a later time in the long struggle against the Ottoman Empire. However, the cost of building them indebted the Hungarian king to the major feudal landlords, so that the royal power reclaimed by Béla IV after his father Andrew II significantly weakened it was once again dispersed among the lesser nobility.

Late medieval period (1301–1526)

Árpád succession
After a destructive period of interregnum (1301–1308), the first Angevin king of Hungary, Charles I ("Charles the Great") successfully restored royal power and defeated oligarchic rivals known as the "little kings". A descendant of the Árpád dynasty in the female line, he reigned between 1308 and 1342. His new fiscal, customs and monetary policies proved successful.

One of the primary sources of the new king's power was the wealth derived from the gold mines of eastern and northern Hungary. Production eventually reached the remarkable figure of 3,000 lb. (1350 kg) of gold annually—one-third of the total production of the world as then known and five times as much as that of any other European state. Charles also sealed an alliance with Polish King Casimir the Great. After Italy, Hungary was the first European country in which the Renaissance appeared. One sign of its progressiveness was the establishment of a printing press in Buda in 1472 by András Hess, one of the earliest outside of the German lands.

Louis the Great (r. 1342–1382), the second Hungarian king of the Angevin line, extended his rule as far as the Adriatic Sea and occupied the Kingdom of Naples several times. In 1351, the Golden Bull of 1222 was completed with a law of entail. This stipulated that the nobles' hereditary lands could not be taken away and must remain in the possession of their families. Louis became king of Poland from 1370 to 1382. The epic hero of Hungarian literature and warfare, the king's champion Miklós Toldi lived during his reign. Louis had become popular in Poland because of his campaign against the Tatars and pagan Lithuanians. In two successful wars against Venice (1357–1358 and 1378–1381), he was able to annex Dalmatia, Ragusa and other territories on the Adriatic Sea. Venice was also required to raise the Angevin flag in St. Mark's Square on holy days. Louis retained his strong influence in the political life of the Italian Peninsula for the rest of his life.

Some Balkan states (such as Wallachia, Moldova, Serbia, and Bosnia) became his vassals while the Ottoman Turks confronted them ever more often. In 1366 and 1377, Louis led successful campaigns against the Ottomans (such as the Battle of Nicapoli in 1366). From the time of the death of Casimir the Great in 1370, he was also king of Poland. In cultural affairs, he is notable for establishing a university in Pécs in 1367.

King Louis died without a male heir, and after years of civil war, the future Holy Roman Emperor Sigismund (r. 1387–1437), a prince of the Luxembourg line, succeeded to the throne by marrying the daughter of Louis the Great, Mary of Hungary (who was herself crowned a "king" in 1382), becoming an official co-ruler and consolidating his power. It was not for entirely selfless reasons that one of the leagues of barons helped him to power: Sigismund had to pay for the support of the lords by transferring a sizeable part of the royal properties. For some years, the baron's council governed the country in the name of the Holy Crown; the king was even imprisoned for a short time. The restoration of the authority of the central administration took decades. After Mary's death, Sigismund ruled as a sole ruler for life.

In 1404, Sigismund introduced the Placetum Regnum. According to this decree, Papal bulls and messages could not be pronounced in Hungary without the consent of the king. Sigismund summoned the Council of Constance that met between 1414 and 1418 to abolish the Avignon Papacy and end the Western Schism of the Catholic Church, which was resolved by the election of Pope Martin V. During his long reign, the royal castle of Buda became probably the largest Gothic palace of the late Middle Ages.

After the death of Sigismund in 1437, his son-in-law, Albert II of Germany, assumed the title King of Hungary. In 1437, there was an anti-feudal and anti-clerical peasant revolt in Transylvania which was strongly influenced by Hussite ideas. The first Hungarian Bible translation was completed in 1439 just before Albert's death in 1439. 

From a small noble family in Transylvania, John Hunyadi grew to become one of the country's most powerful lords, thanks to his outstanding capabilities as a mercenary commander. In 1446, the parliament elected him governor (1446–1453), then regent (1453–1456). He was a successful crusader against the Ottoman Turks, with one of his greatest victories the Siege of Belgrade in 1456. Hunyadi defended the city against the onslaught of the Ottoman Sultan Mehmed II. During the siege, Pope Callixtus III ordered the bells of every European church to be rung every day at noon as a call for believers to pray for the defenders of the city. However, in many countries (such as England and the Spanish kingdoms), the news of the victory arrived before the order, and the ringing of the church bells at noon was transformed into a commemoration of the victory. The popes did not withdraw the order, and Catholic (and the older Protestant) churches still ring the noon bell in the Christian world to this day.

Matthias Corvinus

The last strong Hungarian king was Matthias Corvinus (r. 1458–90), the son of John Hunyadi. His accession represented the first time in the history of the medieval Hungarian kingdom that a member of the nobility without dynastic ancestry mounted the royal throne. Although very prominent in the governing of the kingdom of Hungary, Matthias's father John Hunyadi was never crowned king or contracted a dynastic marriage. Matthias was a true Renaissance prince: a successful military leader and administrator, an outstanding linguist, a learned astrologer, and an enlightened patron of the arts and learning. Although he regularly convened the Diet and expanded the lesser nobles' powers in the counties, he exercised absolute rule over Hungary by means of a huge secular bureaucracy.

Matthias set out to build a realm that would expand to the south and northwest, while he also implemented internal reforms. The serfs considered Matthias a just ruler, because he protected them from excessive demands and other abuses by the magnates. Like his father, Matthias desired to strengthen the kingdom of Hungary to the point where it could become the foremost regional power, indeed strong enough to push back the Ottoman Empire; towards that end he deemed it necessary to conquer large parts of the Holy Roman Empire. 

Matthias's standing mercenary army was called the Black Army of Hungary. It was an unusually large army for its time, and it secured a series of victories in the Austrian–Hungarian War by capturing parts of Austria (including Vienna) in 1485, as well as parts of Bohemia in the Bohemian War of 1477–88. In 1467, Mathias and his Black Army fought against Moldavia. In this case, the attempt to expand Hungarian territories was unsuccessful when Matthias lost the Battle of Baia. In 1479, however, the Hungarian army destroyed the Ottoman and Wallachian troops at the Battle of Breadfield under the leadership of general Pál Kinizsi. 

Matthias's library, the Bibliotheca Corviniana, was Europe's greatest collection of historical chronicles and works of philosophy and science in the 15th century, and second in size only to the Vatican Library in Rome, which mainly contained religious materials. The library, which has been destroyed in 1526 after Hungarian forces at Mohács were defeated by the Ottomans, is registered as a UNESCO Memory of the World site. Mattias died without a legal successor, a circumstance that engendered a serious political crisis in the Hungarian kingdom.

Decline and partition

Events of the 1490–1526 period in Hungarian history created conditions that would lead to a loss of independence unforeseen by contemporary observers and policy makers. Besides internal conflicts, the Hungarian state was gravely threatened by the expanding Ottoman Empire. By the early 16th century, the Ottoman Empire—directly south of Hungary—had become the second most populous political state in the world, which facilitated the raising of the largest armies of the era. However, Hungarian policy makers at the time were not as conscious of this threat as they should have been.

Instead of preparing for the defence of the country against foreign powers, Hungarian magnates were much more focused on the threat to their privileges from a strong royal power. Not wanting another assertive king after the death of the childless Matthias Corvinus, the magnates arranged for the accession of King Vladislaus II of Bohemia precisely because of his notorious weakness; in fact, he was known as King Dobzse (from Czech Dobře, meaning "Good" or, loosely, "OK") for his habit of accepting with that word every paper laid before him. During his reign (1490–1516), the central power began to experience severe financial difficulties, largely because of the enlargement of feudal lands at his expense. The magnates also dismantled the administrative systems in the country that had worked so successfully for Matthias. The country's defenses declined as border guards and castle garrisons went unpaid, fortresses fell into disrepair, and initiatives to increase taxes to reinforce defenses were stifled. Hungary's international role was neutralized, its political stability shaken, and social progress was deadlocked.

In 1514, the weakened and aging Vladislaus faced a major peasant rebellion led by György Dózsa. It was ruthlessly crushed by the Hungarian nobles led by János Szapolyai. The resulting degradation of order paved the way for Ottoman ambitions to acquire Hungarian territory. In 1521, the strongest Hungarian fortress in the south, Nándorfehérvár (modern Belgrade), fell to the Turks, and in 1526 the Hungarian army was crushed at the Battle of Mohács. The young King Louis II died in the battle along with General Tomori. The early appearance of Protestantism further worsened internal unity in the anarchical country.

Early modern period

Ottoman wars

After the Ottomans achieved their first decisive victory over the Hungarian army at the Battle of Mohács, their forces conquered large parts of the kingdom of Hungary and continued their expansion until 1556. This period was characterized by political chaos. A divided Hungarian nobility elected two kings simultaneously, Szapolyai and the Austrian Ferdinand of Habsburg. Armed conflicts between the rival monarchs further weakened the country. With the Turkish conquest of Buda in 1541, Hungary was riven into three parts.

The northwestern part of the old kingdom of Hungary (present-day Slovakia, western Transdanubia and Burgenland, plus western Croatia and parts of present-day northeastern Hungary) remained under Habsburg rule as the realm of King Ferdinand. Although initially independent, it would later become a part of the Habsburg monarchy under the informal name Royal Hungary. The Habsburg emperors would from then on be crowned also as kings of Hungary. The Turks were unable to conquer the northern and western parts of Hungary.

The eastern part of the kingdom (Partium and Transylvania) at first became an independent principality but was gradually brought under Turkish rule as a vassal state of the Ottoman Empire. The remaining central area (most of present-day Hungary), including the capital of Buda, became a province of the Ottoman Empire. Much of the land was devastated by recurrent warfare. Most small Hungarian settlements disappeared. Rural people living in the new Ottoman provinces could survive only in larger settlements known as Khaz towns, which were owned and protected directly by the sultan. The Turks were indifferent to the Christian denominations practiced by their Hungarian subjects.

For this reason, a majority of Hungarians living under Ottoman rule became Protestant (largely Calvinist), as Habsburg counter-Reformation efforts could not penetrate the Ottoman lands. Largely throughout this time, Pozsony (in German, Pressburg, today Bratislava) acted as the capital of the kingdom of Hungary (1536–1784), the town in which the Hungarian kings were crowned (1563–1830) and the seat of the Diet of Hungary (1536–1848). Nagyszombat (modern Trnava) acted in turn as the religious center beginning in 1541. The vast majority of the soldiers in service in the Ottoman fortresses in the territory of Hungary were Orthodox and Muslim Balkan Slavs, instead of ethnic Turkish people.

In 1558 the Transylvanian Diet of Turda declared free practice of both the Catholic and Lutheran religions but prohibited Calvinism. In 1568, the diet extended this freedom, declaring that, "It is not allowed to anybody to intimidate anybody with captivity or expulsion for his religion". Four religions were declared as accepted (recepta), while Orthodox Christianity was "tolerated" (though the building of stone Orthodox churches was forbidden). When Hungary entered the Thirty Years' War of 1618–48, Royal (Habsburg) Hungary joined the Catholic side, then Transylvania joined the Protestant side.

In 1686, two years after the unsuccessful Battle of Buda, a renewed European campaign was started to re-take the Hungarian capital. This time, the army of the Holy League was twice as large, at over 74,000 men, including German, Croat, Dutch, Hungarian, English, Spanish, Czech, Italian, French, Burgundian, Danish and Swedish soldiers, along with other Europeans as volunteers, artilleryman, and officers, and the Christian forces reconquered Buda in the second Battle of Buda. The second Battle of Mohács (1687) was a crushing defeat for the Turks. In the next few years, all former Hungarian lands, except areas near Timișoara (Temesvár), were taken back from the Turks. At the end of the 17th century, Transylvania also became part of Hungary again. In the Treaty of Karlowitz of 1699, these territorial changes were officially recognised, and in 1718, the entire kingdom of Hungary was removed from Ottoman rule.

As a consequence of the constant warfare between Hungarians and Ottoman Turks, population growth was stunted, and the network of medieval settlements with their urbanized bourgeois inhabitants perished. The 150 years of Turkish wars fundamentally changed the ethnic composition of Hungary. As a result of demographic losses, including deportations and massacres, the number of ethnic Hungarians at the end of the Turkish period was substantially diminished.

Anti-Habsburg uprisings

There was a series of anti-Habsburg uprisings between 1604 and 1711, rebelling against Austrian rule and restrictions on non-Catholic Christian denominations. With the exception of the last, all took place within the territories of Royal Hungary but were usually organized from Transylvania. The last uprising was led by Francis II Rákóczi, who took power as the "Ruling Prince" of Hungary after the declared dethronement of the Habsburgs in 1707 at the Diet of Ónod.

Despite some successes by the anti-Habsburg Kuruc army, such as the near-capture of the Austrian Emperor Joseph I by Ádám Balogh, the rebels lost the decisive Battle of Trenčín in 1708. When Austrians defeated the Kuruc uprising in 1711, Rákóczi was in Poland. He later fled to France, then to Turkey, and died in 1735 in Tekirdağ (Rodosto). Afterward, to make further armed resistance infeasible, the Austrians demolished most of the castles on the border between the reclaimed territories occupied earlier by the Ottomans and Royal Hungary.

Modern history

Period of Reforms (1825–1848)
Hungarian nationalism emerged among intellectuals influenced by the Age of Enlightenment and Romanticism. It grew rapidly, providing the foundation for the revolution of 1848–49. There was a special focus on the Magyar language, which replaced Latin as the language of the state and the schools. In the 1820s, Emperor Francis I was forced to convene the Hungarian Diet, which inaugurated a Reform Period. Nevertheless, progress was slowed by the nobles who clung to their privileges (exemption from taxes, exclusive voting rights, etc.). Therefore, the achievements were mostly of a symbolic character, such as the progress of the Magyar language.

Count István Széchenyi, the nation's most prominent statesman, recognized the urgent need for modernization, and his message was taken to heart by other Hungarian political leaders. The Hungarian Parliament was reconvened in 1825 to handle financial needs. A liberal party emerged focusing on the peasantry and proclaiming an understanding of the needs of the laborers. Lajos Kossuth emerged as leader of the lower gentry in the Parliament. Habsburg monarchs, desiring an agrarian, traditional Hungary, tried to hinder the industrialization of the country. A remarkable upswing started as the nation concentrated on modernization despite Habsburg obstruction of all important liberal laws concerning civil and political rights and economic reforms. Many reformers (such as Lajos Kossuth and Mihály Táncsics) were imprisoned by the authorities.

Revolution and war of independence

On 15 March 1848, mass demonstrations in Pest and Buda enabled Hungarian reformists to push through a list of Twelve Demands. The Hungarian Diet took advantage of the Revolutions of 1848 in the Habsburg areas to enact the April Laws, a comprehensive legislative program of dozens of civil rights reforms. Faced with revolution both at home and in Hungary, Austrian Emperor Ferdinand I at first had to accept Hungarian demands. After the Austrian uprising was suppressed, a new emperor Franz Joseph replaced his epileptic uncle Ferdinand. Joseph rejected all reforms and started to arm against Hungary. A year later, in April 1849, an independent government of Hungary was established.

The new government seceded from the Austrian Empire. The House of Habsburg was dethroned in the Hungarian part of the Austrian Empire, and the first Republic of Hungary was proclaimed, with Lajos Kossuth as governor and president. The first prime minister was Lajos Batthyány. Joseph and his advisers skillfully manipulated the new nation's ethnic minorities, the Croatian, Serbian and Romanian peasantry, led by priests and officers firmly loyal to the Habsburgs, and induced them to rebel against the new government. The Hungarians were supported by the vast majority of the Slovaks, Germans, and Rusyns of the country, and almost all the Jews, as well as by a large number of Polish, Austrian and Italian volunteers.

Many members of the non-Hungarian nationalities secured high positions in the Hungarian army, for example General János Damjanich, an ethnic Serb who became a Hungarian national hero through his command of the 3rd Hungarian Army Corps. Initially, the Hungarian forces (Honvédség) managed to hold their ground. In July 1849, the Hungarian Parliament proclaimed and enacted the most progressive ethnic and minority rights in the world, but it was too late. To subdue the Hungarian revolution, Joseph had prepared his troops against Hungary and obtained help from the "Gendarme of Europe", Russian Czar Nicholas I. In June, Russian armies invaded Transylvania in concert with Austrian armies marching on Hungary from western fronts on which they had been victorious (Italy, Galicia and Bohemia).

The Russian and Austrian forces overwhelmed the Hungarian army, and General Artúr Görgey surrendered in August 1849. The Austrian marshall Julius Freiherr von Haynau then became governor of Hungary for a few months and on 6 October ordered the execution of 13 leaders of the Hungarian army as well as Prime Minister Batthyány; Kossuth escaped into exile. Following the war of 1848–1849, the country sank into "passive resistance". Archduke Albrecht von Habsburg was appointed governor of the Kingdom of Hungary, and this time was remembered for Germanisation pursued with the help of Czech officers.

Austria-Hungary (1867–1918)

Vienna realized that political reform was unavoidable to secure the integrity of the Habsburg Empire. Major military defeats, such as the Battle of Königgrätz in 1866, forced Emperor Joseph to accept internal reforms. To appease Hungarian separatists, the emperor made an equitable deal with Hungary, the Austro-Hungarian Compromise of 1867 negotiated by Ferenc Deák, by which the dual monarchy of Austria-Hungary came into existence. The two realms were governed separately by two parliaments from two capitals, with a common monarch and common foreign and military policies. Economically, the empire was a customs union. The first prime minister of Hungary after the compromise was Count Gyula Andrássy. The old Hungarian constitution was restored, and Franz Joseph was crowned king of Hungary.

In 1868, Hungarian and Croatian assemblies concluded the Croatian–Hungarian Agreement by which Croatia was recognised as an autonomous region.

The nation of Austria-Hungary was geographically the second largest country in Europe after Russia. After Russia and the German Empire, it was the third most populous country in Europe.

Hungarian nationalists demanded education in the Magyar language, a position that united Catholics and Protestants opposed to instruction in Latin as desired by Catholic bishops. In the diet of 1832–36, the conflict between Catholic laymen and clergy sharpened considerably, and a mixed commission was established. It offered the Protestants certain limited concessions. The basic issue of this religious and educational struggle was how to promote Magyar language and Magyar nationalism and achieve more independence from German Austria.

The land-owning nobility controlled the villages and monopolized political roles. In Parliament, the magnates held life memberships in the upper house, but the gentry dominated the lower house and, after 1830, parliamentary life. The tension between "crown" (the German-speaking Habsburgs in Vienna) and "country" remained a constant political fixture as the Compromise of 1867 enabled the Magyar nobility to run the country, but left the emperor with control over foreign and military policies. However, after Andrássy served as prime minister, he became foreign minister of Austria-Hungary (1871–1879) and set foreign policies with an eye to Hungarian interests. Andrássy was a conservative; his foreign policies looked to expanding the empire into southeast Europe, preferably with British and German support, and without alienating Turkey. He saw Russia as the main adversary, because of its own expansionist policies toward Slavic and Orthodox areas. He distrusted Slavic nationalist movements as a threat to his multi-ethnic empire. Meanwhile, conflicts between magnates and gentry appeared regarding protection against cheap food imports (in the 1870s), the Church-state problem (in the 1890s), and the "constitutional crisis" (in the 1900s). The gentry gradually lost their power locally and rebuilt their political base more on office-holding rather than land ownership. They depended more on the state apparatus and were reluctant to challenge it.

Economy
The era witnessed significant economic development in the rural areas. The formerly backwards Hungarian economy became relatively modern and industrialized by the turn of the 20th century, although agriculture remained dominant in the GDP until 1880. In 1873, the old capital Buda and Óbuda (ancient Buda) were officially merged with the third city, Pest, thus creating the new metropolis of Budapest. The dynamic Pest grew into the country's administrative, political, economic, trade and cultural hub.

Technological advancement accelerated industrialization and urbanization. The GDP per capita grew roughly 1.45% per year from 1870 to 1913. That level of growth compared very favorably to that of other European nations such as Britain (1.00%), France (1.06%), and Germany (1.51%). The leading industries in this economic expansion were electricity and electro-technology, telecommunications, and transport (especially locomotive, tram and ship construction). The key symbols of industrial progress were the Ganz concern and Tungsram Works. Many of the state institutions and modern administrative systems of Hungary were established during this period.

The census of the Hungarian state in 1910 (excluding Croatia), recorded the following population distribution: Hungarian 54.5%, Romanian 16.1%, Slovak 10.7%, and German 10.4%. The religious denomination with the greatest number of adherents was Roman Catholicism (49.3%), followed by the Calvinism (14.3%), Greek Orthodoxy (12.8%), Greek Catholicism (11.0%), Lutheranism (7.1%), and Judaism (5.0%)

World War I

After the assassination of the Austrian Archduke Franz Ferdinand in Sarajevo on 28 June 1914, a series of crises escalated quickly. A general war began on 28 July with a declaration of war on Serbia by Austria-Hungary. Austria-Hungary drafted 9 million soldiers in World War I, of which 4 million were from the kingdom of Hungary. Austria-Hungary fought on the side of Germany, Bulgaria and Ottoman Empire—the so-called Central Powers. They occupied Serbia, and Romania declared war. The Central Powers then conquered southern Romania and the Romanian capital of Bucharest. In November 1916, Emperor Franz Joseph died; the new monarch, Emperor Charles I of Austria (IV. Károly), sympathized with the pacifists in his realm.

In the east, the Central Powers repelled attacks from the Russian Empire. The Eastern Front of the so-called Entente Powers allied with Russia completely collapsed. Austria-Hungary withdrew from the defeated countries. On the Italian front, the Austro-Hungarian army could not make more successful progress against Italy after January 1918. Despite successes on the Eastern Front, Germany suffered stalemate and eventual defeat on the more determinant Western Front.

By 1918, the economic situation had deteriorated alarmingly in Austria-Hungary; strikes in factories were organized by leftist and pacifist movements, and uprisings in the army had become commonplace. In the capital cities of Vienna and Budapest, the Austrian and the Hungarian leftist liberal movements and their leaders supported the separatism of ethnic minorities. Austria-Hungary signed the Armistice of Villa Giusti in Padua on 3 November 1918. In October 1918, the personal union between Austria and Hungary was dissolved.

Interwar period (1918–1939)

After the collapse of a short-lived communist regime, according to historian István Deák:
Between 1919 and 1944 Hungary was a rightist country. Forged out of a counter-revolutionary heritage, its governments advocated a "nationalist Christian" policy; they extolled heroism, faith, and unity; they despised the French Revolution, and they spurned the liberal and socialist ideologies of the 19th century. The governments saw Hungary as a bulwark against bolshevism and bolshevism's instruments: socialism, cosmopolitanism, and Freemasonry. They perpetrated the rule of a small clique of aristocrats, civil servants, and army officers, and surrounded with adulation the head of the state, the counterrevolutionary Admiral Horthy.

Hungarian People's Republic

In the aftermath of World War I, while ally Germany was defeated in 1918 on the Western Front, the Austro-Hungarian monarchy politically collapsed. Former Prime Minister István Tisza was murdered in Budapest during the Aster Revolution of October 1918. On 31 October 1918, the success of this revolution brought the leftist liberal Count Mihály Károlyi to power as prime minister. Károlyi was a devotee of the Entente powers from the beginning of the war. On 13 November 1918, Charles I surrendered his powers as king of Hungary, however, he did not abdicate, a technicality that made a return to the throne possible.

French Entente troops landed in Greece to re-arm the defeated countries of Romania and Serbia and provide military assistance to the newly formed country of Czechoslovakia. Despite a general armistice agreement, the Balkan French army organized new campaigns against Hungary with the help of the Czechoslovak, Romanian and Serbian governments.

The First Hungarian republic was proclaimed on 16 November 1918 with Károlyi named as president. Károlyi tried to build the republic as the "eastern Switzerland" and persuade non-Hungarian minorities (in particular, Slovaks, Romanians and Ruthenians) to stay loyal to the country, offering them autonomy. However these efforts came too late. In response to Woodrow Wilson's conception of pacifism, Károlyi ordered the full disarmament of the Hungarian army, thus the republic remained without a national defence at a time of particular vulnerability. The emerging surrounding states were not hesitant to arm themselves and occupy large parts of the country with the help of the Entente, while there was no agreement yet about their borders.

On 5 November 1918, the armed forces of the provisional State of Slovenes, Croats and Serbs, with French support, attacked the southern parts of Kingdom of Hungary. On 8 November, the armed forces of the Czechoslovak Republic that was proclaimed on 28 October, attacked northern parts of Kingdom of Hungary. The Treaty of Bucharest that was signed in May 1918 was denounced in October 1918 by the Romanian government, which then re-entered the war on the Allied side and advanced to the Maros (Mureș) river in Transylvania.

A separatist movement inspired by Wilson's Fourteen Points proclaimed the unification of Transylvania with Romania. In November the Romanian National Central Council representing all Romanians in Transylvania, notified the Budapest government that it would take control of 23 Transylvanian counties (and parts of 3 others) and requested a Hungarian response by 2 November. The Hungarian government (after negotiations with the council) rejected the proposal, claiming that it failed to secure the rights of the ethnic Hungarian population and the German minority.

On 2 December, the Romanian army started to attack the eastern (Transylvanian) parts of Kingdom of Hungary. Despite the march of foreign armed forces, the Károlyi government had made all spontaneous armed associations illegal and introduced proposals to maintain the integrity of the territory of the former kingdom, but he refused to reorganize the Hungarian armed forces. These measures failed to stem popular discontent, especially when the Entente powers began awarding pieces of Hungary's traditional territories to Romania and the newly formed states Yugoslavia and Czechoslovakia, giving priority to ethno-linguistic criteria over historical ones. French and Serbian forces occupied the southern parts of the former monarchy.

By February 1919, the new pacifist Hungarian government had lost all popular support in view of its failures on both domestic and military fronts. On 21 March 1919, after the Entente military representative demanded more territorial concessions from Hungary, Károlyi signed all the concessions presented to him and resigned.

Hungarian Soviet Republic
The Communist Party of Hungary, led by Béla Kun, allied itself with the Hungarian Social Democratic Party, came to power, and proclaimed the Hungarian Soviet Republic. Social Democrat Sándor Garbai was the official head of government, but the Soviet Republic was dominated de facto by Béla Kun, who was in charge of foreign affairs. The communists—"The Reds"—came to power largely thanks to its organized fighting force (no other major political entity had one of its own), and they promised that Hungary would defend its territory without conscription, possibly with the help of the Soviet Red Army.

The Red Army of Hungary was a small voluntary army of 53,000 men, and most of its soldiers were armed factory workers from Budapest. Initially, Kun's regime achieved some military successes: under the command of its genius strategist Colonel Aurél Stromfeld, the Hungarian Red Army ousted Czechoslovak troops from the north and planned to march against the Romanian army in the east. In terms of domestic policy, the communist government nationalized industrial and commercial enterprises, socialized housing, transport, banking, medicine, cultural institutions, and all landholdings of more than 400,000 square meters.

The support of the communists proved to be short-lived in Budapest, however, and they had never been popular in country towns and countryside. In the aftermath of a coup attempt, the government took a series of actions referred to as the Red Terror, murdering several hundred people (mostly scientists and intellectuals). The Soviet Red Army was never able to aid the Hungarian republic. Despite the great military successes against the Czechoslovakian army, the communist leaders gave back all recaptured lands. That attitude demoralized the voluntary army; the Hungarian Red Army was dissolved before it could successfully complete its campaigns. In the face of domestic backlash and an advancing Romanian force in the Hungarian–Romanian War of 1919, Béla Kun and most of his comrades fled to Austria, and Budapest was occupied on 6 August. Kun and his followers took along numerous art treasures and the gold stocks of the national bank. All these events, and in particular the final military defeat, led to a deep feeling of dislike among the general population against the Soviet Union (which did not offer military assistance) and the Hungarian Jews (since most members of Kun's government were Jewish, making it easy to blame the Jews for the government's crimes).

Counterrevolution

The new fighting force in Hungary were the Conservative Royalists counter-revolutionaries – the "Whites". These, who had been organizing in Vienna and established a counter-government in Szeged, assumed power, led by István Bethlen, a Transylvanian aristocrat, and Miklós Horthy, the former commander in chief of the Austro-Hungarian navy. The conservatives determined the Károlyi government and communists as capital treason.

In the absence of a strong national police force or regular military forces, a White Terror began in western Hungary by half-regular and half-militarist detachments that spread throughout the country. Many arrant communists and other leftists were tortured and executed without trial. Radical Whites launched pogroms against the Jews, displayed as the cause of all territorial losses of Hungary. The most notorious commander of the Whites was Pál Prónay. The evacuating Romanian army pillaged the country: livestock, machinery and agricultural products were carried to Romania in hundreds of freight cars.

On 16 November 1919, with the consent of Romanian forces, the army of right-wing former admiral Miklós Horthy marched into Budapest. His government gradually restored order and stopped terror, but thousands of sympathizers of the Károlyi and Kun regimes were imprisoned. Radical political movements were suppressed. In March 1920, the parliament restored the Hungarian monarchy as a regency but postponed the election of a king until civil disorder had subsided. Instead, Horthy was elected regent and empowered, among other things, to appoint Hungary's prime minister, veto legislation, convene or dissolve the parliament, and command the armed forces.

Treaty of Trianon

Hungary's assent to the Treaty of Trianon on 4 June 1920 ratified the decision of the victorious Entente powers to re-draw the country's borders. The treaty required Hungary to surrender more than two-thirds of its pre-war territories. The goal of this measure was to permit the minority populations of the former Austria-Hungary to reside in states dominated by their own ethnicity, but many Hungarians still lived in such territories. As a result, nearly one third of the 10 million ethnic Hungarians found themselves resident outside their diminished homeland. They became resentful minorities in hostile political units.

New international borders separated Hungary's industrial base from its old sources of raw materials and its former markets for agricultural and industrial products. Hungary lost 84% of its timber resources, 43% of its arable land, and 83% of its iron ore. Although post-Trianon Hungary retained 90% of the engineering and printing industry of the former Kingdom of Hungary, only 11% of timber and 16% iron was retained. In addition, 61% of arable land, 74% of public road, 65% of canals, 62% of railroads, 64% of hard surface roads, 83% of pig iron output, 55% of industrial plants, 100% of gold, silver, copper, mercury and salt mines, and most of all, 67% of credit and banking institutions of the former Kingdom of Hungary lay within the territory of Hungary's neighbors.

Irredentism—the demand for return of lost territories—became a central "Maimed Hungary" theme in national politics.

The Regency
Horthy appointed Count Pál Teleki as prime minister in July 1920. His government issued a numerus clausus law that limited the admission of "political insecure elements" (these were often Jews) to universities and took initial steps towards fulfilling a promise of major land reform by dividing about 3,850 km2 from the largest estates into small holdings in order to quiet rural discontent. Teleki's government resigned, however, after Charles I of Austria, the former emperor of Austria and king of Hungary, attempted unsuccessfully to retake Hungary's throne in March 1921. The attempt split conservative politicians who favored a Habsburg restoration and nationalist right-wing radicals who supported the election of a native Hungarian king. Count István Bethlen, a non-affiliated right-wing member of the parliament, took advantage of this rift to form a new Party of Unity under his leadership. Horthy then appointed Bethlen prime minister. Charles died soon after he failed a second time to reclaim the throne in October 1921, and Hungary remained a kingdom without a king.

Prime Minister Bethlen dominated Hungarian politics between 1921 and 1931. He fashioned a political machine by amending the electoral law, providing jobs in the expanding bureaucracy to his supporters, and manipulating elections in rural areas. Bethlen restored order to the country by giving the radical counter-revolutionaries payoffs and government jobs in exchange for ceasing their campaign of terror against Jews and leftists.

In 1921, Bethlen made a deal with the Social Democrats and trade unions (called the Bethlen-Peyer Pact) to legalize their activities and free political prisoners in return for their pledge to refrain from spreading anti-Hungarian propaganda, calling political strikes, and attempting to organize the peasantry. Bethlen brought Hungary into the League of Nations in 1922 and out of international isolation by signing a treaty of friendship with Italy in 1927. Overall, Bethlen sought to pursue a strategy of strengthening the economy and building relations with stronger nations. Irredentism, the revision of the Treaty of Trianon, rose to the top of Hungary's political agenda. Revision of the treaty had such a broad backing in Hungary that Bethlen used it, at least in part, to deflect criticism of his economic, social and political policies.

The worldwide Great Depression that began in 1929 induced a drop in the standard of living and the political mood of the country shifted further towards the right. In 1932, Horthy appointed Gyula Gömbös to prime minister, who changed the course of Hungarian policy towards closer cooperation with Germany and started an effort to Magyarize the few remaining ethnic minorities in Hungary.

Gömbös signed a trade agreement with Germany that helped Hungary's economy out of depression but made Hungary dependent on the German economy for both raw materials and markets. Adolf Hitler appealed to Hungarian desires for territorial revisionism, while extreme right-wing organizations such as the Arrow Cross Party increasingly embraced extreme Nazi policies. They sought the suppression and victimization of Jews. The government passed the First Jewish Law in 1938: the law established a quota system to limit Jewish involvement in the Hungarian economy.

In 1938, Béla Imrédy became prime minister. Imrédy's attempts to improve Hungary's diplomatic relations with the United Kingdom initially made him very unpopular in Germany and Italy. In light of Germany's Anschluss with Austria in March, he realized that he could not afford to alienate Germany and Italy for long. In the autumn of 1938, his foreign policy became very much pro-German and pro-Italian.

Intent on amassing a base of power in Hungarian right wing politics, Imrédy began to suppress political rivals. The increasingly influential Arrow Cross Party was harassed and eventually banned by Imrédy's administration. As Imrédy drifted further to the right, he proposed that the government be re-organized along totalitarian lines, and he drafted a harsher Second Jewish Law. Parliament, under the new government of Pál Teleki, approved the Second Jewish Law in 1939, which greatly restricted Jewish involvement in the economy, culture and society and, significantly, defined Jews by race instead of religion. This definition significantly and negatively altered the status of those who had formerly converted from Judaism to Christianity.

World War II

During World War II, the Kingdom of Hungary was a member of the Axis powers. Nazi Germany and Fascist Italy sought to enforce the claims of Hungarians living in territories Hungary lost in 1920 with the signing of the Treaty of Trianon, and the two Vienna Awards returned parts from Czechoslovakia and Romania to Hungary. During the 1930s, the Kingdom of Hungary relied on increased trade with Fascist Italy because it had taken a fall during the Great Depression. This was important at the time because Hungary's foreign debt enlarged as Bethlen expanded the bureaucracy to absorb the university graduates who, if left idle, might have threatened the civil order. The 1939 annexation of the remainder or Carpathian Ruthenia was an own action initiated by Hungary after the breakup of Czechoslovakia.

On 1 September 1939, Nazi Germany invaded Poland and started the Second World War. Previously, on 24 July, Teleki wrote to Hitler that Hungary would not participate in war against Poland as a matter of national honor. 

On 20 November 1940, under pressure from Germany, Teleki affiliated Hungary with the Tripartite Pact. In December 1940, he also signed an ephemeral "Treaty of Eternal Friendship" with Yugoslavia. A few months later, after a Yugoslavian coup threatened the success of the planned German invasion of the Soviet Union, Hitler asked the Hungarians to support his invasion of Yugoslavia. He promised to return some former Hungarian territories lost after World War I in exchange for cooperation. Unable to prevent Hungary's participation in the war alongside Germany, Teleki committed suicide. The right-wing radical László Bárdossy succeeded him as prime minister. Following the Invasion of Yugoslavia and the proclamation of the Independent State of Croatia, Hungary annexed Bácska, the remainder of Baranya, Muravidék and Muraköz.

Hungary did not immediately participate in the invasion of the Soviet Union. The invasion began on 22 June 1941, but Hitler did not directly ask for Hungarian assistance. Additionally, the Hungarian participation in Operation Barbarossa during 1941 was limited in part because the country had no large army before 1939, and the time to prepare, train and equip troops was short. Nonetheless, many Hungarian officials argued for participation in the war in order to encourage Hitler not to favor Romania in the event of border revisions in Transylvania. Romanians had fought the Hungarians during the 1848 revolution, which caused many fights between both countries. Currently, the majority of Hungarians still view Romania negatively. 

After war against Russia broke out on the Eastern Front in 1941, many Hungarian officials argued for participation in the war on the German side so as not to encourage Hitler into favoring Romania in the event of border revisions in Transylvania. Hungary entered the war and on 1 July 1941, at the direction of the Germans, the Hungarian Karpat Group advanced far into southern Russia. At the Battle of Uman, the Gyorshadtest participated in the encirclement of the 6th Soviet Army and the 12th Soviet Army. Twenty Soviet divisions were captured or destroyed.

Worried about Hungary's increasing reliance on Germany, Admiral Horthy forced Bárdossy to resign and replaced him with Miklós Kállay, a veteran conservative of Bethlen's government. Kállay continued Bárdossy's policy of supporting Germany against the Red Army, while he also surreptitiously entered into negotiations with the Western Powers.

In late 1941, the Hungarian army participated in the invasion of Yugoslavia and the invasion of the Soviet Union. Poland quickly collapsed, and Hungary allowed 70,000 Polish refugees to enter, much to Hitler's annoyance.  During the Battle of Stalingrad, the Hungarian Second Army suffered terrible losses. Shortly after the fall of Stalingrad in January 1943, the Hungarian Second Army effectively ceased to exist as a functioning military unit.

Secret negotiations with the British and Americans continued. Aware of Kállay's deceit and fearing that Hungary might conclude a separate peace, Hitler ordered Nazi troops to launch Operation Margarethe and occupy Hungary in March 1944. Döme Sztójay, an avid supporter of the Nazis, became the new prime minister with the aid of a Nazi military governor, Edmund Veesenmayer. SS Colonel Adolf Eichmann went to Hungary to oversee the large-scale deportations of Jews to German death camps in occupied Poland. Between 15 May and 9 July 1944, the Hungarians deported 437,402 Jews to the Auschwitz concentration camp. In August 1944, Horthy replaced Sztójay with the anti-Fascist General Géza Lakatos. Under the Lakatos regime, the acting Interior Minister Béla Horváth ordered Hungarian gendarmes to prevent any Hungarian citizens from being deported.

In September 1944, Soviet forces crossed the Hungarian border. On 15 October 1944, Horthy announced that Hungary had signed an armistice with the Soviet Union. The Hungarian army ignored the armistice. The Germans launched Operation Panzerfaust and, by kidnapping his son (Miklós Horthy Jr.), forced Horthy to abrogate the armistice, depose the Lakatos government, and name the leader of the Arrow Cross Party, Ferenc Szálasi, as prime minister. Szálasi became prime minister of a new fascist Government of National Unity and Horthy abdicated. In cooperation with the Nazis, Szálasi restarted the deportations of Jews, particularly in Budapest. Thousands more Jews were killed by Hungarian Arrow Cross members. The retreating German army demolished the rail, road, and communications systems.

On 28 December 1944, a provisional government was formed in Hungary under acting Prime Minister Béla Miklós. Miklós and Szálasi's rival governments each claimed legitimacy: the Germans and pro-German Hungarians loyal to Szálasi fought on, as the territory effectively controlled by the Arrow Cross regime shrunk gradually. The Red Army completed the encirclement of Budapest on 29 December 1944 and the siege of Budapest began; it continued into February 1945. Budapest unconditionally surrendered to the Soviet Red Army on 13 February 1945.

On 20 January 1945, representatives of the Hungarian provisional government signed an armistice in Moscow. Szálasi's government fled the country by the end of March. Officially, Soviet operations in Hungary ended on 4 April 1945, when the last German troops were expelled. On 7 May 1945, General Alfred Jodl, the German Chief of Staff, signed the unconditional surrender of all German forces.

The era was characterized by growing anti-Semitism, which was also supported at the level of state politics, leading to the violent deaths of more than 400,000 Jews from 1941 to 1945. From 1944 to 1945, the Soviets were driven out, and the Germans occupied Hungary. The war took many lives among the population, the most devastating was the siege of Budapest. 

There were about half a million civilian and military victims of World War II in Hungary, in addition to the hundreds of thousands killed in death camps because of their ethnicity. The country's infrastructure was severely damaged, and most of the national wealth was taken by the Germans and the Soviets. All the recaptured territories were also lost, and the Hungarian civilian population then lost even more people, who suffered the return of the attacks in neighboring countries in Slovakia, Transcarpathia, and especially in Vojvodina from deportation and massacres. 

World War I ended with Hungary as a loser. Following the Paris Peace Treaty of 1947, Hungary had an area smaller than the Trianon borders, and the Czechoslovak delegation succeeded in removing the Bratislava bridgehead (62 km 2 ) from the country. The country, plagued by looting and inflation, was then ordered to pay $300 million in damages.

As regards Hungary's World War II casualties, Tamás Stark of the Hungarian Academy of Sciences has provided a detailed assessment of losses from 1941 to 1945 in Hungary. He calculated military losses at 300,000–310,000, including 110–120,000 killed in battle and 200,000 missing in action and prisoners of war in the Soviet Union. Hungarian military losses include 110,000 men who were conscripted from the annexed territories of Greater Hungary in Slovakia, Romania and Yugoslavia and the deaths of 20,000–25,000 Jews conscripted for army labor units. Civilian losses of about 80,000 include 45,500 killed in the 1944–1945 military campaign and in air attacks, and the genocide of Romani people of 28,000 persons. Jewish Holocaust victims totaled 600,000 (300,000 in the territories annexed between in 1938 and 1941, 200,000 in the pre-1938 countryside and 100,000 in Budapest).

Post-war communist period

Transition to communism (1944–1949)
The Soviet Army occupied Hungary from September 1944 until April 1945. The siege of Budapest lasted almost two months, from December 1944 to February 1945 (the longest successful siege of any city in the entire war, including Berlin), and the city suffered widespread destruction, including the demolition of all the Danube bridges, which were blown up by the Germans in a desperate effort to slow the Soviet advance. In Moscow in November 1944, Hungarian officials led by Miklós met with exiled communists and agreed on a postwar government. Miklós would be premier, and the Communist Party would be legalized and join the government. The provisional national government formed on 22 December 1944 in Debrecen, which was under Soviet control. It reorganized the public sector, began land reform, modernized elementary education, and called for elections.

By signing the Peace Treaty of Paris of 1947, Hungary again lost all the territories that it had gained between 1938 and 1941. Neither the Western Allies nor the Soviet Union supported any change in Hungary's pre-1938 borders, which was the primary motive behind the Hungarian involvement in the war, except three more villages to be transferred to the recreated Czechoslovakia (Horvátjárfalu, Oroszvár, and Dunacsúny). The Soviet Union annexed sub-Carpathia (before 1938 the eastern edge of Czechoslovakia), which is today part of Ukraine.

The Treaty of Peace with Hungary signed on 10 February 1947 declared that, "The decisions of the Vienna Award of November 2, 1938, are declared null and void", and Hungarian boundaries were fixed along the former frontiers as they existed on 1 January 1938 except for a minor loss of territory on the Czechoslovakian border. Many of the communist leaders of 1919 returned from Moscow. The first major violation of civil rights was suffered by the ethnic German minority, half of which (240,000 people) were deported to Germany in 1946–1948, although the great majority of them had not supported Germany during the war and were not members of any pro-Nazi movement. There was a forced "exchange of population" between Hungary and Czechoslovakia, which involved about 70,000 Hungarians living in Slovakia and somewhat smaller numbers of ethnic Slovaks living in the territory of Hungary. Unlike the Germans, these people were allowed to carry some of their property with them.

The Soviets originally planned for a piecemeal introduction of the communist regime in Hungary, therefore when they set up a provisional government in Debrecen on 21 December 1944, they were careful to include representatives of several moderate parties. Following the demands of the Western Allies for a democratic election, the Soviets authorized the only essentially free election held in post-war eastern Europe in Hungary in November 1945. This was also the first election held in Hungary on the basis of universal franchise.

People voted for party lists, not for individual candidates. The Independent Smallholders' Party, a center-right peasant party, won 57% of the vote. Despite the hopes of the communists and the Soviets that the distribution of the aristocratic estates among the poor peasants would increase their popularity, the Hungarian Communist Party received only 17% of the votes. The Soviet commander in Hungary, Marshal Voroshilov, refused to allow the Smallholders' Party to form a government on their own. Under Voroshilov's pressure, the Smallholders organized a coalition government including the communists, the social democrats and the National Peasant Party (a left-wing peasant party), in which the communists held some of the key posts. On 1 February 1946 Hungary was declared a republic, and the leader of the Smallholders, Zoltán Tildy, became president. He handed over the office of prime minister to Ferenc Nagy. Mátyás Rákosi, leader of the Communist Party, became deputy prime minister. Another leading communist, László Rajk, became minister of the interior responsible for controlling law enforcement and established the Hungarian security police (ÁVH). The communists exercised constant pressure on the Smallholders both inside and outside the government. They nationalized industrial companies, banned religious civil organizations and occupied key positions in local public administration. In February 1947, the police began arresting leaders of the Smallholders Party, charging them with "conspiracy against the republic". Several prominent figures decided to emigrate or were forced to escape abroad, including Prime Minister Nagy in May 1947. Later, Rákosi boasted that he had dealt with his partners in the government, one by one, cutting them off like slices of salami.

At the parliamentary election in August 1947, the communists committed widespread election fraud with absentee ballots (the so-called "blue slips"), but even so, they only managed to increase their share from 17% to 24% in Parliament. The social democrats (by this time servile allies of the communists) received 15% in contrast to their 17% in 1945. The Smallholders' Party lost much of its popularity and ended up with 15%, but their former voters turned towards three new center-right parties which seemed more determined to resist the communist onslaught: their combined share of the total votes was 35%.

Faced with their second failure at the polls, the communists changed tactics, and, under new orders from Moscow, decided to eschew democratic facades and speed up the communist takeover. In June 1948, the Social Democratic Party was forced to "merge" with the Communist Party to create the Hungarian Working People's Party, which was dominated by the communists. Anti-communist leaders of the social democrats, such as Károly Peyer and Anna Kéthly, were forced into exile or excluded from the party. Soon after, President Tildy was removed from his position and replaced by a fully cooperative social democrat, Árpád Szakasits.

Ultimately, all "democratic" parties were organized into a so-called People's Front in February 1949, thereby losing even the vestiges of their autonomy. The leader of the People's Front was Rákosi. Opposition parties were simply declared illegal and their leaders arrested or forced into exile. On 18 August 1949, the parliament passed the Hungarian Constitution of 1949, which was modeled after the 1936 constitution of the Soviet Union. The name of the country changed to the People's Republic of Hungary, "the country of the workers and peasants" where "every authority is held by the working people". Socialism was declared to be the main goal of the nation. A new coat-of-arms was adopted with communist symbols such the red star, hammer and sickle.

Stalinist era (1949–1956)
Rákosi, who as a chief secretary of the Hungarian Working People's Party was de facto the leader of Hungary, possessed practically unlimited power and demanded complete obedience from fellow members of the party, including his two most trusted colleagues, Ernő Gerő and Mihály Farkas. All three of them returned to Hungary from Moscow, where they had spent long years and had close ties to high-ranking Soviet leaders. Their main rivals in the party were the "Hungarian" communists who led the illegal party during the war and were considerably more popular within party ranks.

Rajk, their most influential leader, was arrested in May 1949. He was accused of rather surreal crimes, such as spying for Western imperialist powers and for Yugoslavia (which was also a communist country but in very bad relations with the Soviet Union at the time). At his trial in September 1949, he made a forced confession to be an agent of Horthy, Leon Trotsky, Josip Broz Tito and Western imperialism. He also admitted that he had taken part in a murder plot against Rákosi and Gerő. Rajk was found guilty and executed. In the next three years, other leaders of the party deemed untrustworthy, such as former social democrats or other Hungarian illegal communists such as János Kádár, were also arrested and imprisoned on trumped-up charges.

The showcase trial of Rajk is considered the beginning of the worst period of the Rákosi dictatorship. Rákosi attempted to impose totalitarian rule on Hungary. The centrally orchestrated personality cult focused on him and Joseph Stalin soon reached unprecedented proportions. Rákosi's images and busts were everywhere, and all public speakers were required to glorify his wisdom and leadership. In the meantime, the secret police, led through Gábor Péter by Rákosi, mercilessly persecuted all "class enemies" and "enemies of the people".

An estimated 2,000 people were executed and over 100,000 were imprisoned. Some 44,000 ended up in forced-labor camps, where many died from the horrible work conditions, poor food and practically no medical care. Another 15,000 people—mostly former aristocrats, industrialists, military generals and other upper-class people—were deported from the capital and other cities to countryside villages where they were forced to perform hard agricultural labor. These policies were opposed by some members of the Hungarian Working People's Party, and around 200,000 were expelled by Rákosi from the organization.

Nationalization
By 1950, the state controlled most of the economy, as all large and mid-sized industrial companies, plants, mines, banks of all kind as well as all companies of retail and foreign trade were nationalized without any compensation. Slavishly following Soviet economic policies, Rákosi declared that Hungary would become a "country of iron and steel" even though Hungary lacked iron ore completely. The forced development of heavy industry served military purposes; it was meant as preparation for the impending war against "Western imperialism". A disproportionate amount of the country's resources were spent on building whole new industrial cities and plants from scratch, while much of the country was still in ruins since the war. Traditional strengths of Hungary, such as the agricultural and textile industries, were neglected.

Large agricultural latifundia were divided and distributed among poor peasants already in 1945. In agriculture, the government tried to force independent peasants to enter cooperatives in which they would become merely paid laborers, but many of them stubbornly resisted. The government retaliated with ever-higher requirements of compulsory food quotas imposed on peasants' produce. Rich peasants, called 'kulaks' in Russian, were declared "class enemies" and suffered all sorts of discrimination, including imprisonment and loss of property. With them, some of the most able farmers were removed from production. The declining agricultural output led to a constant scarcity of food, especially meat.

Rákosi rapidly expanded the education system in Hungary. This was an attempt to replace the educated class of the past by what Rákosi called a new "working intelligentsia". In addition to effects such as better education for the poor, more opportunities for working class children and increased literacy in general, this measure also included the dissemination of communist ideology in schools and universities. Also, as part of efforts at separation of church and state, practically all religious schools were taken into state ownership, and religious instruction was denounced as retrograde propaganda and gradually eliminated from schools.

The Hungarian churches were systematically intimidated. Cardinal József Mindszenty, who had bravely opposed the German Nazis and the Hungarian Fascists during the Second World War, was arrested in December 1948 and accused of treason. After five weeks under arrest (which included torture), he confessed to the charges against him and he was sentenced to life imprisonment. The Protestant churches were also purged, and their leaders were replaced by those willing to remain loyal to Rákosi's government.

The Hungarian military hastily staged public, pre-arranged trials to purge "Nazi remnants and imperialist saboteurs". Several officers were sentenced to death and executed in 1951, including Lajos Toth, a distinguished fighter ace of the World War II Royal Hungarian Air Force, who had voluntarily returned from U.S. captivity to help revive Hungarian aviation. The victims were cleared posthumously following the overthrow of communism.

Preparations for a show trial started in Budapest in 1953 to prove that Raoul Wallenberg had not been dragged off in 1945 to the Soviet Union but was the victim of "cosmopolitan Zionists". For the purposes of this show trial, three Jewish leaders as well as two would-be "eyewitnesses" were arrested and interrogated by torture. The show trial was initiated in Moscow, following Stalin's anti-Zionist campaign. After the death of Stalin and Lavrentiy Beria, the preparations for the trial were stopped and the arrested persons were released.

Rivalry between communist leaders
Rákosi's priorities for the economy were developing military industry and heavy industry and providing the Soviet Union with war compensation. Improving standards of living were not a priority, and for this reason the people of Hungary saw living standards fall. Although his government became increasingly unpopular, he had a firm grip on power until Stalin died on 5 March 1953 and a confused power struggle began in Moscow. Some of the Soviet leaders perceived the unpopularity of the Hungarian regime and ordered Rákosi to give up his position as prime minister in favor of another former communist-in-exile in Moscow, Imre Nagy, who was Rákosi's chief opponent in the party. Rákosi, however, retained his position as general secretary of the Hungarian Working People's Party, and over the next three years the two men became involved in a bitter struggle for power.

As Hungary's prime minister, Nagy slightly relaxed state control over the economy and the mass media and encouraged public discussion on political and economic reform. In order to improve general living standards, he increased the production and distribution of consumer goods and reduced the tax and quota burdens of the peasants. Nagy also closed forced-labor camps, released most of the political prisoners—the communists were allowed back into party ranks—and reined in the secret police, whose hated head Gábor Péter was convicted and imprisoned in 1954. All these rather moderate reforms earned him widespread popularity in the country, especially among the peasantry and the left-wing intellectuals.

Following a turn in Moscow, where Georgy Malenkov, Nagy's primary patron, lost the power struggle against Nikita Khrushchev, Rákosi started a counterattack on Nagy. On 9 March 1955, the central committee of the Hungarian Working People's Party condemned Nagy for "rightist deviation". Hungarian newspapers joined the attacks, and Nagy was accused of being responsible for the country's economic problems. On 18 April, he was dismissed from his post by a unanimous vote of the National Assembly. Soon after, Nagy was even excluded from the party and temporarily retired from politics. Rákosi once again became the unchallenged leader of Hungary.

Rákosi's second reign, however, did not last long. His power was undermined by a speech made by Khrushchev in February 1956, in which he denounced the policies of Stalin and his followers in eastern Europe, especially the attacks on Yugoslavia and the propagation of cults of personality. On 18 July 1956, visiting Soviet leaders removed Rákosi from all his positions, and he boarded a plane bound for the Soviet Union, never to return to Hungary. But the Soviets made a major mistake by the appointment of his close friend and ally Gerő as his successor, who was equally unpopular and shared responsibility for most of Rákosi's crimes.

The fall of Rákosi was followed by a flurry of reform agitation both inside and outside the party. Rajk and his fellow victims of the showcase trial of 1949 were cleared of all charges, and on 6 October 1956, the party authorized a reburial, which was attended by tens of thousands of people and became a silent demonstration against the crimes of the regime. On 13 October, it was announced that Nagy had been re-instated as a member of the party.

1956 revolution

On 23 October 1956, a peaceful student demonstration in Budapest produced a list of 16 Demands of Hungarians Revolutionaries for reform and greater political freedom. As the students attempted to broadcast these demands, the State Protection Authority made some arrests and tried to disperse the crowd with tear gas. When the students attempted to free those arrested, the police opened fire on the crowd, setting off a chain of events which led to the Hungarian Revolution of 1956.

That night, commissioned officers and soldiers joined the students on the streets of Budapest. Stalin's statue was brought down and the protesters chanted "Russians go home", "Away with Gerő" and "Long live Nagy". The central committee of the Hungarian Working People's Party responded to these developments by requesting Soviet military intervention and deciding that Nagy should become head of a new government. 

Soviet tanks entered Budapest in the early morning of 24 October. On 25 October, Soviet tanks opened fire on protesters in Parliament Square. One journalist at the scene saw 12 dead bodies and estimated that 170 had been wounded. Shocked by these events, the central committee of the Hungarian Working People's Party forced Gerő to resign from office and replaced him with Kádár.

Nagy went on Radio Kossuth and announced he had taken over the leadership of the government as chairman of the Council of Ministers. He also promised "the far-reaching democratization of Hungarian public life, the realization of a Hungarian road to socialism in accord with our own national characteristics, and the realization of our lofty national aim: the radical improvement of the workers' living conditions." On 28 October, Nagy and a group of his supporters, including Kádár, Géza Losonczy, Antal Apró, Károly Kiss, Ferenc Münnich and Zoltán Szabó, managed to take control of the Hungarian Working People's Party. At the same time, revolutionary workers' councils and local national committees were formed all over Hungary.

The change of leadership in the party was reflected in the articles of the government newspaper Szabad Nép ("Free People"). On 29 October the newspaper welcomed the new government and openly criticized Soviet attempts to influence the political situation in Hungary. This view was supported by Radio Miskolc, which called for the immediate withdrawal of Soviet troops from the country. On 30 October, Nagy announced that he was freeing Cardinal Mindszenty and other political prisoners. He also informed the people that his government intended to abolish the one-party state. This was followed by statements of Tildy, Kéthly and Farkas concerning the restitution of the Smallholders Party, the Social Democratic Party and the Petőfi (former Peasants) Party.

Nagy's most controversial decision took place on 1 November, when he announced that Hungary intended to withdraw from the Warsaw Pact and proclaimed Hungarian neutrality. He asked the United Nations to become involved in the country's dispute with the Soviet Union. On 3 November, Nagy announced details of his coalition government. It included communists (Kádár, Georg Lukács, and Géza Losonczy), three members of the Smallholders' Party (Tildy, Béla Kovács and István Szabó), three Social Democrats (Kéthly, Gyula Keleman, Joseph Fischer), and two Petőfi Peasants (István Bibó and Farkas). Pál Maléter was appointed minister of defence.

Khrushchev became increasingly concerned about these developments and on 4 November 1956 sent the Red Army into Hungary. Soviet tanks immediately captured Hungary's airfields, highway junctions and bridges. Fighting took place all over the country, and the Hungarian forces were quickly defeated. During the Hungarian Uprising, an estimated 20,000 people were killed, nearly all during the Soviet intervention. Nagy was arrested and imprisoned until his execution in 1958. Other government ministers or supporters who were either executed or died in captivity include Maléter, Losonczy, Attila Szigethy and Miklós Gimes.

Post-revolution Kádár era (1956–1989)

Once he was in power, Kádár led an attack against revolutionaries. 21,600 mavericks (democrats, liberals, and reformist communists alike) were imprisoned, 13,000 interned, and 400 killed. But in the early 1960s, Kádár announced a new policy under the motto of "He who is not against us is with us", a modification of Rákosi's statement, "He who is not with us is against us". He declared a general amnesty, gradually curbed some of the excesses of the secret police, and introduced a relatively liberal cultural and economic course aimed at overcoming the post-1956 hostility towards him and his regime.

In 1966, the central committee approved the "New Economic Mechanism", through which it sought to rebuild the economy, increase productivity, make Hungary more competitive in world markets, and create prosperity to ensure political stability. Over the next two decades of relative domestic quiet, Kádár's government responded alternately to pressures for minor political and economic reforms as well as to counter-pressures from reform opponents. By the early 1980s, it had achieved some lasting economic reforms and limited political liberalization and pursued a foreign policy that encouraged more trade with the West. Nevertheless, the New Economic Mechanism led to mounting foreign debt that was incurred in order to shore up unprofitable industries.

Hungary's transition to a Western-style democracy was one of the smoothest among the former Soviet bloc. By late 1988, activists within the party and bureaucracy and Budapest-based intellectuals were increasing pressure for change. Some of these became reform socialists, while others began movements which were to develop into parties. Young liberals formed the Federation of Young Democrats (Fidesz); a core from the so-called democratic opposition formed the Alliance of Free Democrats (SZDSZ), and the national opposition established the Hungarian Democratic Forum (MDF). Civic activism intensified to a level not seen since the 1956 revolution.

End of communism

In 1988, Kádár was replaced as general secretary of the Communist Party, and reform communist leader Imre Pozsgay was admitted to the politburo. In 1989, the Parliament adopted a "democracy package" that included trade-union pluralism; freedom of association, assembly, and the press; a new electoral law; and in October 1989 a radical revision of the constitution, among others. Since then, Hungary has reformed its economy and increased its connections with western Europe. It became a member of the European Union in 2004.

A central committee plenum in February 1989 endorsed in principle the multiparty political system and the characterisation of the October 1956 revolution as a "popular uprising", in the words of Pozsgay, whose reform movement had been gathering strength as Communist Party membership declined dramatically. Kádár's major political rivals then cooperated to move the country gradually to democracy. The Soviet Union reduced its involvement by signing an agreement in April 1989 to withdraw Soviet forces by June 1991.

National unity culminated in June 1989 as the country re-buried Nagy, his associates, and, symbolically, all other victims of the 1956 revolution. A Hungarian National Round Table, comprising representatives of the new parties and some re-created old parties (such as the Smallholders and Social Democrats), the Communist Party, and different social groups, met in late summer 1989 to discuss major changes to the Hungarian constitution in preparation for free elections and the transition to a fully free and democratic political system.

In October 1989, the Communist Party convened its last congress and re-established itself as the Hungarian Socialist Party. In a historic session on 16–20 October 1989, the Parliament adopted legislation providing for multi-party parliamentary elections and a direct presidential election. The legislation transformed Hungary from a People's Republic into the Republic of Hungary, guaranteed human and civil rights, and created an institutional structure that ensures separation of powers among the judicial, executive, and legislative branches of government. On the anniversary of the 1956 Revolution, 23 October, the Hungarian Republic was officially declared by the provisional President of the Republic Mátyás Szűrös as the replacement for the Hungarian People's Republic. The revised constitution also championed the "values of bourgeois democracy and democratic socialism" and gave equal status to public and private property.

Third Republic (since 1989)

Foundation
The first free parliamentary election, held in May 1990, was effectively a plebiscite on communism. The revitalized and reformed communists performed poorly despite having more than the usual advantages of an "incumbent" party. Populist, center-right, and liberal parties fared best, with the MDF winning 43% of the vote and the SZDSZ capturing 24%. Under Prime Minister József Antall, the MDF formed a center-right coalition government with the Independent Smallholders' Party and the Christian Democratic People's Party to command a 60% majority in the parliament. Parliamentary opposition parties included SZDSZ, the Hungarian Socialist Party, and Fidesz.

Between by June 1991, the Soviet troops ("Southern Army Group") left Hungary. The total number of Soviet military and civilian personnel stationed in Hungary was around 100,000, having at their disposal approximately 27,000 military equipment. The withdrawal was performed with 35,000 railway cars. The last units commanded by general Viktor Silov crossed the Hungarian-Ukrainian border at Záhony-Chop.

Péter Boross succeeded as prime minister after Antall died in December 1993. The Antall/Boross coalition governments struggled to create a reasonably well-functioning parliamentary democracy in a market-economy, and to manage the related political, social and economic crises resulting from the collapse of the former Communist system. The massive decline in living standards led to a massive loss of political support.

In the May 1994 election, the Socialists won a plurality of votes and 54% of the seats (with the new Prime Minister, Gyula Horn) after a campaign focused largely on economic issues and the substantial decline in living standards since 1990. This signaled a wish to turn back to the relative security and stability of the socialist era, but voters rejected both right and left-wing extremist solutions – no such party gained seats in parliament. After its disappointing result in the election, leadership of the Fidesz party opted for an ideological shift from a liberal to a conservative party. This caused a severe split in the membership and many members left for the other liberal party, the SZDSZ, which formed a coalition with the socialists, leading to a more than two-thirds majority.

Economic reform
The coalition was influenced by the socialism of Horn, by the economic focus of its technocrats (who had been Western-educated in the 1970s and 1980s) and ex-cadre entrepreneur supporters, and by its liberal coalition partner the SZDSZ. Facing the threat of state bankruptcy, Horn initiated economic reforms and aggressive privatization of state enterprises to multinational companies in return for expectations of investment (in the form of reconstruction, expansion and modernization). The socialist-liberal government adopted a fiscal austerity program, the Bokros package in 1995, which had dramatic consequences for social stability and quality of life. The government introduced post-secondary tuition fees, partially privatized state services, but supported science both directly and indirectly, through the private sector. The government pursued a foreign policy of integration with Euro-Atlantic institutions and reconciliation with neighboring countries. Critics argued that the policies of the ruling coalition were more right-wing than those of the previous right-wing government had been.

The Bokros package and efforts at privatizations were unpopular with voters, as were rising crime rates, allegations of government corruption, and an attempt to restart the unpopular program of building a dam on the Danube. This dissatisfaction among voters resulted in a change of government following the 1998 parliamentary elections.

After a disappointing result in the 1994 elections, Fidesz under the presidency of Viktor Orbán had changed its political position from liberal to national conservative, adding "Hungarian Civic Party" (Magyar Polgári Párt) to its shortened name. The conservative turn caused a severe split in the membership. Péter Molnár left the party, as well as Gábor Fodor and Klára Ungár, who joined the SZDSZ. Orbán's Fidesz party gained the plurality of parliamentary seats in the 1998 election and forged a coalition with the Smallholders and the Democratic Forum.

First cabinet of Viktor Orbán: 1998–2002
The government led by Orbán promised to stimulate faster growth, curb inflation, and lower taxes. It inherited an economy with positive economic indicators, including a growing export-surplus. The government abolished tuition fees and aimed to create good market conditions for small businesses and to encourage local production with domestic resources. In terms of foreign policy, the Orbán administration continued to pursue Euro-Atlantic integration as its first priority but was a more vocal advocate of minority rights for ethnic Hungarians abroad than the previous government had been. As a result of a 1997 referendum, Hungary joined NATO in 1999. In 2002, the European Union agreed to admit Hungary along with 9 other countries as members on 1 January 2004.

Fidesz was criticized by its adversaries for the party's presentation of history, particularly the 1989 fall of communism. While Fidesz had suggested that the Socialist party is the moral and legal successor to the hated state party of the Communist past, the socialists would assert that they had been those who had pushed for change from within, derided Fidesz members for crediting themselves as the sole creators and heirs of the fall of communism.

In the 2002 election the MSZP/SZDSZ left-wing coalition narrowly beat the Fidesz/MDF right-wing coalition in a fierce political fight, with record-high 73% voter turnout. Péter Medgyessy became prime minister.

MSZP: 2002–2010

Under the socialist-liberal government, the economic balance of the Hungarian economy started a free fall, while quality of life, infrastructure and technology improved. On 12 April 2003, Hungarians voted to join the European Union (EU), with 83% of the votes in favor. Since the EU had already accepted Hungary as a possible member, the four leading political parties (MSZP, Fidesz, SZDSZ and MDF) agreed to establish the required prerequisites and policies and to work together to prepare the country for the accession with the least possible harm to the economy and people while maximizing the positive effects on the country. On 1 May 2004 Hungary became a member of the EU.

In the elections of April 2006, Hungary decided to re-elect its government for the first time since 1989, though with Prime Minister Ferenc Gyurcsány. The left strengthened its position, with the coalition of the MSZP and the SZDSZ reaching 54% of the vote and winning 210 seats as opposed to the previous 198. The parties of the previous legislature (Fidesz, MDF, SZDSZ, MSZP) again won parliamentary seats. The new parliament assembled in late May 2006, and the new government was formed in June 2006.

The government presented plans to reach balance and sustainable economic growth by removing subsidies to the growth of standard of living, which it had not mentioned during its electoral campaign. A leaked speech was followed by mass protests against the Gyurcsány government between 17 September and 23 October 2006. It was the first sustained protest in Hungary since 1989. From 2007, when increased inflation caused by tax increases reduced the standard of living, a complete restructuring of the state administration, energy sector, relations with private business, health sector and social welfare took place. Members of affected professional unions describe the measures as lacking discussion and uncompromising. The country joined the Schengen Area at the end of 2007.

In 2008, the coalition broke up over the disagreement whether the insurance side of the health sector should be state-owned and its policies decided by the state (as preferred by the Socialists) or by private companies (as preferred by the Liberals). This conflict was followed by a successful public referendum, initiated by Fidesz, calling for the abolition of university tuition fees, direct payments by insured patients on receiving medical attention, and daily fees at hospital by insured patients. This effectively stopped the restructuring of health care, while it remained completely publicly owned. Because of this the liberals left the coalition, and from then on the socialists governed as a minority.

The 2008 financial crisis caused further budgetary constraints. After Gyurcsány's resignation, the socialists put forward a "government of experts" under Gordon Bajnai in March 2009, which would only make essential macroeconomic decisions.

Orbán regime: 2010– 

Fidesz regained power in the 2010 Hungarian parliamentary election in a landslide, winning two-thirds of the seats in Parliament. In the autumn municipal elections, Fidesz achieved a majority in almost all local and mayoral elections, winning the traditional strongholds of the liberal parties. This started the System of National Cooperation (NER). The Second Orbán Government promulgated the new Constitution of Hungary, adopted in 2011 and in force since 1 January 2012. The main goal of the government was to restart economic growth. It introduced a flat tax system for income tax at 16% for everyone.

After the new constitution came into effect, Orbán, according to his critics, gradually consolidated power and began the process of making Hungary less democratic. Orbán referred to Hungary as an "illiberal state". Orbán discarded the idea of welfare state, stating that the Hungarian economy must be workfare based. By 2014, significant improvements were made in decreasing unemployment (from 11.4% in 2010), to 7.1% in 2014, and generating economic growth (reaching 3.5% in 2014, the top value among EU member states; the growth has been very unequal: the wealth of the top 20% of the society grew significantly, while the ratio of people living below poverty line increased from 33% in 2010 to 40% in 2014. The government centralized the education system, and started a multiple-year-long program for increasing the salaries of teachers and health professionals. In the 2014 Hungarian parliamentary election, Fidesz again won a supermajority but only by a one-MP margin. In February 2015, a by-election was held in the city of Veszprém, where an opposition-nominated MP was elected, thus Fidesz lost its supermajority.

Under the Third Orbán Government, the 2015 European migrant crisis affected Hungary as one of the countries with a southern external border of the European Union. The government erected the Hungarian border barrier along its border with Serbia and Croatia in summer 2015. Attempts by migrants to cross the barrier using force were met with riot police in September 2015, and the barrier was reinforced in 2016. 

The EU's Justice and Home Affairs Council approved a migrant quota plan. Following the decision, Hungary and Slovakia took legal action over EU's mandatory migrant quotas at the European Court of Justice in Luxembourg City. The government also called for the 2016 Hungarian migrant quota referendum in October. While an overwhelming majority (98%) of those voting rejected the EU's migrant quotas, voter turnout at 44% was below the 50%, which would have been required for the referendum to be considered valid.

In the 2018 Hungarian parliamentary election, Fidesz–KDNP again won a supermajority, with no change in the numbers of seats held from the previous election. The Fourth Orbán Government was formed on 18 May 2018. In October 2019, the opposition won the mayoral election in the capital, Budapest, meaning Prime Minister Orbán and the Fidesz–KDNP governing coalition got their first major electoral blow since 2006.

In March 2022, the Hungarian parliament chose Katalin Novák, a close ally of Orbán, as the first female President of Hungary for the mainly ceremonial post. In the 2022 Hungarian parliamentary election a month later, Orbán won a fourth consecutive term in office. Fidesz secured another  two-thirds majority in parliament.

In September 2022, the Ninth European Parliament passed a resolution saying Hungary is an electoral autocracy and can no longer be considered a full democracy.

Historiography
In the 1920s historians with a sense of national mission urgently rewrote the history of Hungary to emphasize nationalism and deemphasize Austrian influences. By the 1930s, political history was in decline and an effort was made to introduce social history in the style of the French Annales School. After the war only Marxist interpretations were allowed.

With the end of communism in Hungary in 1989, Marxist historiography collapsed and social history came into its own, especially the study of the demographic patterns of the early modern period. Research priorities have shifted toward urban history and the conditions of everyday life.

See also

 Aftermath of World War I
 Collectivization in Hungary
 Demographics of Hungary
 History of Hungary before the Hungarian Conquest
 History of the Jews in Hungary
 History of the Székely people
 Hungarian art
 Hungarian Socialist Workers' Party
 Hungarian Working People's Party
 Liberalism and radicalism in Hungary
 Music history of Hungary
 Politics of Hungary
 Principality of Transylvania (1570–1711)
 Timeline of Budapest and History of Budapest

Lists:
 List of heads of state of Hungary
 List of Hungarian monarchs
 List of prime ministers of Hungary

General:
 History of Europe

References

Sources and further reading

Surveys

 Covers 1918 to 1991.

 
 (Vol.1 & Vol.2)

Specialized studies


</ref>

 



Historiography

External links

Encyclopaedia Humana Hungarica (1–5)

(The English translations of volumes 6 to 9 are in preparation.)